Cavity Search may refer to:

 Body cavity search, a visual search or a manual internal inspection of body cavities for prohibited material (contraband), such as illegal drugs, money, or weapons
 Cavity Search Records, an independent record label based out of Portland, Oregon
 "Cavity Search" (song), the third track on the "Weird Al" Yankovic album Bad Hair Day